The Ways of Warmdaddy is the second album by the American musician Wessell Anderson, released in 1996. The album title refers to Wynton Marsalis's nickname for Anderson; Anderson started with Marsalis's bands. Anderson supported the album with a North American tour.

Production
Produced by Billy Banks, the album was recorded in New Orleans in the summer of 1995. Anderson wrote six of its eight tracks. The Ways of Warmdaddy includes versions of Duke Ellington's "Mood Indigo" (as a solo saxophone piece for Anderson) and "Rockin' in Rhythm". Ellis Marsalis played piano on three tracks (1, 2 & 5).

Critical reception

The New York Times wrote that "Anderson can be an extraordinarily intelligent and original improviser ... On a number called 'Change of Heart Blues', for instance, his playing brims with odd phrases and clever rhythm play, resulting in a solo that is as memorable as a good melody." The Los Angeles Times determined that "Anderson hasn't yet discovered a way to bring structure and follow-through to his solos, which tend to be undeniably dazzling arrays of rapid-fire runs."

The Fort Worth Star-Telegram stated that "the funk and flavor of New Orleans surround every husky note and bedeviling phrase young altoist Anderson blows." The Boston Herald called Anderson "both a sensitive accompanist and intrepid soloist."

AllMusic deemed the album "a hard-bop (re)hash, well-played, yet tasting a bit like it's been microwaved back to life—a moderately tasty and almost immediately forgettable side dish."

Track listing

References

1996 albums
Atlantic Records albums